Ji Xiaobing  (born 2 November 1987) is a Chinese actor.

Career
In 2010, Ji made his acting debut in the period family drama Family Reunion. In 2011, Ji starred in the military drama The No. 1 Landmark.

In 2013, Ji gained recognition for his performance in the historical drama Legend of Goddess Luo. In 2014, his popularity rose further with his role as Bo Yikao in the mythology drama The Investiture of the Gods. He further proved his versatility, earning recognition for his acting in the family drama Three Queens.

In 2016, Ji starred in the hit fantasy action drama Noble Aspirations. In 2017, Ji starred in the romance comedy drama The Fox's Summer.

In 2018, Ji starred in the hit crime mystery drama  S.C.I. Mystery. He received the Capable Actor of the Year award at the Golden Bud - The Third Network Film and Television Festival,

In 2019, Ji starred in the highly rated romance drama Nice To Meet You, and played the male lead in the police romance drama You Are The Miracle. The same year, he was cast in the romance drama Be With You  as the male lead.

In 2020, Ji starred in the fantasy romance drama Fairyland Lovers.

Filmography

Film

Television series

Awards and nominations

References

External links

1987 births
Living people
Male actors from Jiangsu
Beijing Film Academy alumni
21st-century Chinese male actors
Chinese male television actors